Nationality words link to articles with information on the nation's poetry or literature (for instance, Irish or France).

Events
 Christopher Smart wins the Seatonian Prize for the third time (he won the same prize in 1750 and 1751, and he will win it again in 1753 and 1755).

Works published

Great Britain
 Moses Browne, The Works and Rest of the Creation
 John Byrom, Enthusiasm: A poetical essay
 Richard Owen Cambridge, A Dialogue Between a Member of Parliament and His Servant
 Thomas Cooke, Pythagoras: An ode, published anonymously
 Samuel Davies, Miscellaneous Poems, Chiefly on Divine Subjects, previously published in the Virginia Gazette; English Colonial America
 William Mason, Elfrida: A dramatic poem
 Christopher Smart, Poems on Several Occasions (Some criticism of the work by Sir John Hill (1716-1775) later caused Smart to write The Hilliad, a satire on Hill  in 1753)
 James Sterling, An Epistle to the Hon. Arthur Dobbs, a verse epistle addressed to a projector who sought the Northwest Passage; the neoclassical-style poem asserts that Britain's future will depend on America; English Colonial America

Other
 Christoph Martin Wieland, Germany:
 Spring
 Moral Letters in Verse, 12 letters
 Art of Love

Births

Death years link to the corresponding "[year] in poetry" article:
 January 2 – Philip Freneau (died 1832), American "poet of the American Revolution"
 May 14 – Timothy Dwight IV (died 1817), American academic and educator, eighth president of Yale College, Congregationalist minister, theologian, author and poet
 July 10 – St. George Tucker (died 1827), American lawyer and professor of law at the College of William and Mary
 October 2 – Joseph Ritson (died 1803), English writer and antiquary
 November 20 – Thomas Chatterton (suicide 1770), English poet and literary forger
 November 23 – Ann Eliza Bleecker (died 1783), American poet and correspondent
 Unknown date – Richard Llwyd (died 1835), Welsh poet and writer
 Approximate date – Edmund Gardner (died 1798), English poet

Deaths
Birth years link to the corresponding "[year] in poetry" article:
 January 1 – Shah Abdul Latif Bhittai (born 1689), Sufi scholar and saint, poet of the Sindhi language
 October 24 – Christian Falster (born 1690), Danish poet and philologist
 Li E (born 1692), Chinese poet

See also

 18th century in poetry
 Augustan literature
 Augustan poetry
 List of years in poetry
 Paper War of 1752–1753
 Poetry

Notes

18th-century poetry
Poetry